Fifteen referendums were held in Switzerland during 2000. The first five were held on 12 March on reforming the judiciary and four popular initiatives; "for speeding up direct democracy (time limits for the handling of popular initiatives)", "for a just representation of women in federal authorities", "for the protection of men against manipulations in procreation technology" and one to reduce motorised road by 50%. Whilst the judiciary reform was approved, all four popular initiatives were rejected. The next referendum was held on 21 May to authorise sectoral agreements between Switzerland and the European Union, and was approved by around two-thirds of voters.

The next set of four referendums was held on 24 September on a tax contribution for energy efficiency, as well as three popular initiatives; one for a tax contribution for promoting solar energy (alongside a counterproposal), as well as initiatives "for a regulation of immigration" and "more rights for people thanks to referendums with counter-proposals". Every proposal, including the counter-proposal, was rejected by voters. The final five referendums were held on 26 November on a law on federal employees and four popular initiatives; "for a flexible retirement age for men and women from 62 years on", "economising on military and defence–for more peace and seminal jobs", "for lower hospital expenses" and one against raising the female retirement age. Whilst the federal law was approved, all four popular initiatives were rejected.

Results

EU  bilateral treaty referendum results by canton

 In the referendum with a counter-proposal, voters had the option of not answering. A total of 35,657 voters (1.8%) did not answer the solar energy question, whilst 58,798 (2.9%) did not answer the counter-proposal.

References

2000 elections in Switzerland
2000 referendums
Referendums in Switzerland
Switzerland–European Union relations